is a Japanese rugby union player who plays as a prop. He currently plays for Yokohama Canon Eagles in Japan's domestic Japan Rugby League One. He was signed to the Sunwolves squad for the 2020 Super Rugby season, but did not make an appearance for the side.

References

1997 births
Living people
Japanese rugby union players
Rugby union props
Sunwolves players
Yokohama Canon Eagles players